Manga is a Lolo-Burmese language spoken by the Yi people of China. It is spoken in Gedang Village 格当村, Xinhua Township 新华乡, Funing County, Yunnan (Lama 2012).

References

Hsiu, Andrew. 2014. "Mondzish: a new subgroup of Lolo-Burmese". In Proceedings of the 14th International Symposium on Chinese Languages and Linguistics (IsCLL-14). Taipei: Academia Sinica.
Lama, Ziwo Qiu-Fuyuan (2012), Subgrouping of Nisoic (Yi) Languages, thesis, University of Texas at Arlington (archived)

Mondzish languages
Languages of China